CFLY-FM is a Canadian radio station broadcasting at 98.3 FM in Kingston, Ontario. The station currently broadcasts an adult contemporary format branded as Move 98.3. The station broadcasts with 95,500 watts of power from its transmitter located in Harrowsmith. The station is owned by Bell Media.

History
The station was launched in January 1954 as CKLC-FM, by St. Lawrence Broadcasting. AM sister station CKLC-AM was launched at the same time. The station's original frequency was 99.5, and it was an affiliate of the Canadian Broadcasting Corporation's Dominion Network until the network dissolved in 1962. CKLC-FM's original purpose back in 1953 was to provide a reliable audio link for CKLC-AM, which broadcast from a four-tower array on Wolfe Island. Equalized Bell Telephone broadcast lines were not reliable out to Wolfe Island back in 1953, and the FM signal carried the program feed of CKLC-AM, which was received at the AM transmitter site over the air, and re-broadcast on the 1380 AM signal. Eventually, the Bell line problem was resolved, and the programming on CKLC-FM gradually became its own.

CKLC-FM moved to 98.3 in 1973, and adopted its current callsign in 1978.

The stations were acquired by CHUM Limited in 1998. Since the 1980s, CFLY has programmed some form of adult contemporary. In 1998, the station moved to a hot adult contemporary format, and in 2001, moved back to a AC format. In early 2007, the station moved back to a hot AC format.

On June 22, 2007, the stations were handed over to CTVglobemedia, now Bell Media.

On December 27, 2020, as part of a mass format reorganization by Bell Media, CFLY rebranded as Move 98.3. While the station would run jockless for the first week of the format, on-air staff would return on January 4, 2021.

In 2022, CFLY flipped back to AC.

References

External links
 Move 98.3
 
 

FLY
FLY
FLY
Radio stations established in 1953
1953 establishments in Ontario
FLY